Sarrag (also Romanized as Sarak, Sardag, Sar Rag, and Sarrāk) is a village in Jastun Shah Rural District, Hati District, Lali County, Khuzestan Province, Iran. At the 2006 census, its population was 31, in 6 families.

References 

Populated places in Lali County